Sawako (written: ,  or ) is a feminine Japanese given name. Notable people with the name include:

, Japanese writer and television personality
, Japanese writer
, Japanese singer and idol
, Japanese football player
, Japanese retired professional wrestler

Fictional characters
, protagonist of the manga series Kimi ni Todoke
, a character in the manga series K-On!

See also
Sawako Decides, a 2009 Japanese film

Japanese feminine given names